The 1991 Marlboro Masters of Formula 3 was the first Masters of Formula 3 race held at Circuit Park Zandvoort on 18 August 1991. It was won by David Coulthard, for Paul Stewart Racing.

Drivers and teams

Classification

Qualifying

Race

References

Masters of Formula Three
Masters of Formula Three
Masters of Formula Three
Masters of Formula Three